Mister Lebanon is a male beauty pageant which is held annually to select a young man mohammad who takes on humanitarian duties and represents Lebanon in international beauty pageants, most notably Mister International. The first Mister Lebanon competition was held in 1995 and concluded with crowning Hadi Esta. Rami Atallah was crowned Mister Lebanon for 2018.

History
Mister Lebanon winners often graduate from the pageant circuit to become models, actors or TV hosts. Lebanese titleholders proved considerable performances at international pageants, placing almost every year since the launching of the male beauty pageantry, leading the world to classify Arab men generally, and Lebanese men particularly.

The competition is sponsored by Lebanese Tourism Services which has often contracted with modeling agencies, most notably Nidal's Agency to assign representatives instead of throwing competitions, due to special circumstances such as the 2006 Lebanon War.

Many of the Mister Lebanon winners and competitors went to become celebrities of wide fame and popularity. Ghassan Mawla dominated throughout 2004-2007 with many reality television appearances, a music album and some successful enterprises. In 2012, Wissam Hanna placed fifth in the Arabic version of Dancing with the Stars. The latter and fellow Miss Lebanon winner Rosarita Tawil brought the pageant circuit in Lebanon to massive media and public attention through the show. Asaad Tarabay, Abdel Rahman Bala and Ali Hammoud began successful careers in the modeling and fitness domains after their highly publicized wins.

The current titleholder is Farid Matar who won the prestigious title in late August 2015 and took a break from his interior design studies at Lebanese American University to fulfill his duties, which were politically oriented, unlike the previous Mister Lebanon winners who mostly worked on environmental and social causes. He competed in Mister International 2015 and was placed among the Top 15.

Lebanese delegates proved successful internationally, unlike those from the female parallel of the Mister Lebanon contest, Miss Lebanon. In 2012 Ali Hammoud was assigned to represent Lebanon in Mister International 2012 and was crowned after winning two awards for Best Body and Most Handsome, thus becoming the second Lebanese man to win the pageant, the first being Wissam Hanna. 2012 official Mister Lebanon placed within the Top 10 in one of the greatest male pageants on the planet, Mister World.

International crowns

 
 Three – Mister International winners: 
Wissam Hanna (2006)
Ali Hammoud (2012)
Paul Iskandar (2016)

 One – Mister United Continents winner: 
Kamel Raad (2015)

Titleholders
The winner of Mister Lebanon represents his country at Mister International. On occasion, when the winner does not qualify (due to age) for either contest, a runner-up is sent. Previously, in some instances the winner has also competed at another pageant.

List of Mister Lebanon at International pageants
Color key

See also
 Miss Lebanon

References

External links
 Mister Lebanon Official Website

Male beauty pageants
Lebanese awards
Beauty pageants in Lebanon
Mister Global by country